Kanuites is an extinct genus of paradoxurine viverrid carnivore. It lived in Africa, during the Miocene epoch.

Description
Kanuites was probably an omnivore and may have had retractable claws, like a feline. It may have lived at least part of its life in trees.

References

Viverrids
Miocene carnivorans
Miocene mammals of Africa
Prehistoric carnivoran genera